The exclusive economic zone (EEZ) of Ireland extends  from the coast.  Exclusive economic zones are areas of internationally-recognised rights to conduct certain activities on areas of the high seas but do not give any power over access to those areas, including over shipping or military matters.

Disputes and controversies
Within Ireland's EEZ there is one notable long-running dispute, and from time to time other disputes and issues arise.

Rockall

The area around Rockall is disputed.

Russian military exercise controversy

In January 2022 controversy arose over a proposed Russian military exercise in international waters but inside the EEZ. The Russian government said that they would move the exercises outside the EEZ.

References

External links
Exclusive Economic Zone Boundary Ireland - data.gov.ie
marineregions.org
UK and Ireland's Exclusive Economic Zones - esa.int

Exclusive economic zones
Borders of the Republic of Ireland
Economy of the Republic of Ireland